Hopalong Nunatak is the westernmost and highest of the Whichaway Nunataks in Antarctica. It was first mapped in 1957 by the Commonwealth Trans-Antarctic Expedition and so named to mark the work in this area of the Australian geologist of the expedition in 1956–58.

References

Nunataks of Coats Land